Lake Mathews is a census-designated place in Riverside County, California. The 2010 United States census reported Lake Mathews's population was 5,890.

Geography
According to the United States Census Bureau, the CDP covers an area of 15.9 square miles (41.3 km), all of it land. Woodcrest and the Lake Mathews reservoir are located to the north, and Mead Valley is located to the east.

Demographics

At the 2010 census Lake Mathews had a population of 5,890. The racial makeup of Lake Mathews was 4,239 (72.0%) White, 253 (4.3%) African American, 59 (1.0%) Native American, 193 (3.3%) Asian, 3 (0.1%) Pacific Islander, 891 (15.1%) from other races, and 252 (4.3%) from two or more races. Hispanic or Latino of any race were 1,808 persons (30.7%).

The census reported that 5,866 people (99.6% of the population) lived in households, 24 (0.4%) lived in non-institutionalized group quarters, and no one was institutionalized.

There were 1,847 households, 710 (38.4%) had children under the age of 18 living in them, 1,209 (65.5%) were opposite-sex married couples living together, 182 (9.9%) had a female householder with no husband present, 104 (5.6%) had a male householder with no wife present.  There were 104 (5.6%) unmarried opposite-sex partnerships, and 16 (0.9%) same-sex married couples or partnerships. 248 households (13.4%) were one person and 87 (4.7%) had someone living alone who was 65 or older. The average household size was 3.18.  There were 1,495 families (80.9% of households); the average family size was 3.47.

The age distribution was 1,415 people (24.0%) under the age of 18, 560 people (9.5%) aged 18 to 24, 1,287 people (21.9%) aged 25 to 44, 1,903 people (32.3%) aged 45 to 64, and 725 people (12.3%) who were 65 or older.  The median age was 41.0 years. For every 100 females, there were 105.7 males.  For every 100 females age 18 and over, there were 102.9 males.

There were 1,978 housing units at an average density of 124.2 per square mile, of the occupied units 1,574 (85.2%) were owner-occupied and 273 (14.8%) were rented. The homeowner vacancy rate was 2.3%; the rental vacancy rate was 3.5%.  4,932 people (83.7% of the population) lived in owner-occupied housing units and 934 people (15.9%) lived in rental housing units.

References

Census-designated places in Riverside County, California
Census-designated places in California